Eric Graham Varley, Baron Varley,  (11 August 1932 – 29 July 2008) was a British Labour Party politician and cabinet minister on the right-wing of the party.

Early life

Varley was born at 15 Poolsbrook Square, Poolsbrook, Staveley, near Chesterfield, Derbyshire, the son of Frank Varley, coalminer, and his wife Eva, née Goring. He attended the local secondary modern school after failing his eleven-plus but left at the age of fourteen in 1946. His mother was determined that he should not go down the pit, and he began his working life as an apprentice turner at Staveley iron works, before qualifying as an engineer's turner in 1952. 
If it had not been for his political predilections his career could have gone in an entirely different direction, since in his youth he was regarded as a first-rate soccer player, became a semi-professional, and was believed by experts to have the makings of a leading professional footballer.

Political career
He was active in the National Union of Mineworkers, and became a branch secretary of the union in 1955, joining the Labour Party the same year. After a period at Ruskin College, Varley won the NUM nomination to be the Labour candidate for his home town, where the sitting Labour Member of Parliament (MP) George Benson was retiring from Parliament. He was narrowly selected in June 1963 and duly held the Chesterfield seat in the 1964 election.

Despite rebelling against the government's application to join the Common Market in 1967, Varley became an Assistant Whip later that year, and Parliamentary Private Secretary to the Prime Minister Harold Wilson in November 1968. He served briefly as a junior minister under Tony Benn at the Ministry of Technology from 1969. During the Labour Party's period of opposition in the early 1970s Varley was Chairman of the Trade Union Group of MPs, and became spokesman on fuel and power.

Varley was appointed Secretary of State for Energy in March 1974 when Labour returned to power. The appointment of an NUM-sponsored MP helped the government end the NUM strike which had led the previous government to ration electricity to three days a week. Varley subsidised the National Coal Board and chose a British design for new nuclear power stations over an American rival. He also began the procedure to nationalise North Sea oil. During the Common Market referendum he advocated a 'No' vote but was not prominent in the campaign. Immediately afterwards Wilson swapped Varley's and Benn's posts, so that Varley was effectively promoted to Secretary of State for Industry. In November 1976 Varley suffered an embarrassing public defeat when he determined to shut down the loss-making Chrysler car factory: the Cabinet forced him to increase its subsidy to keep it open. He continued the government's slow nationalisation programme by appointing Michael Edwardes to take over at British Leyland.

When Labour went into opposition in 1979 Varley was elected to the Shadow Cabinet in fifth place. He led Denis Healey's campaign for the party leadership in 1980 and defeated the left-winger Norman Atkinson for the post of party Treasurer (an office he had coveted for some years) in 1981. He served as opposition spokesman on employment, and resisted an attempt by Michael Foot to replace him with Neil Kinnock (whom he disliked) in 1982.

After Kinnock's election as party leader in 1983, Varley announced that he would retire from Parliament at the next general election. However, he was appointed as Chairman of Coalite plc, a private company manufacturing coal-based products including a coke-like smokeless fuel of the same name, and resigned his seat in January 1984. Ironically, this opened the way for Tony Benn to return to the House of Commons as Varley's successor in the seat. Varley served five years at Coalite, and later held other directorships, including a regional director for Lloyds Bank from 1987 to 1991. Ashgate Hospice Ltd, 1987–96; Cathelco Ltd, 1989–99 when he retired; Laxgate Ltd, 1991–92. Following a Labour Party nomination, he was created a life peer on 30 May 1990 taking the title Baron Varley, of Chesterfield in the County of Derbyshire.

Personal life

An observant Methodist all his life, on 11 June 1955 he married Marjorie Turner, a 21-year-old shop assistant, at Middle Duckmanton Methodist Church. She was the daughter of Alfred Turner, a coal miner. They had one son, Roger.

Death

Eric Varley died on 29 July 2008 of cancer at his home.

References

External links 
 

|-

|-

|-

1932 births
2008 deaths
Alumni of Ruskin College
British Secretaries of State
Deaths from cancer in England
Labour Party (UK) MPs for English constituencies
Labour Party (UK) life peers
Members of the Parliament of the United Kingdom for constituencies in Derbyshire
Members of the Privy Council of the United Kingdom
Ministers in the Wilson governments, 1964–1970
National Union of Mineworkers-sponsored MPs
Parliamentary Private Secretaries to the Prime Minister
People from Chesterfield, Derbyshire
UK MPs 1964–1966
UK MPs 1966–1970
UK MPs 1970–1974
UK MPs 1974
UK MPs 1974–1979
UK MPs 1979–1983
UK MPs 1983–1987
Life peers created by Elizabeth II